Budy Michałowskie  is a village in the administrative district of Gmina Jaktorów, within Grodzisk Mazowiecki County, Masovian Voivodeship, in east-central Poland.

The village has a population of 240.

References

Villages in Grodzisk Mazowiecki County